Amor Mašović (born in Sarajevo, Bosnia and Herzegovina on 29 December 1955), is a Bosnian politician and Chairman of the Bosnian Federal Commission for Missing Persons.

He is a Member of Parliament of the Federation of Bosnia and Herzegovina and a member of the International Association of Genocide Scholars.  

As Chairman of the Commission for Missing Persons he is responsible for maintaining the records of individuals missing since the Bosnian war, efforts to trace such individuals, recording and identification of bodily remains, investigation of mass and individual graves, co-operation with local courts in conducting exhumations, autopsies, identifications and evidence gathering, assistance with burial arrangements, and cooperation with UN specialized agencies (UNHCR etc.), the UN Special Envoy for Human Rights in the territories of former Yugoslavia, SFOR, the ICRC Work Group on searching for missing persons, the International Criminal Tribunal for the former Yugoslavia at The Hague and other international and national organizations and institutions.

Under his leadership the Commission's investigative teams had as of 30 December 2007 located over 370 mass graves and over 3,000 joint and individual graves and the exhumation of the remains of some 18,000 missing war victims.

Most recently (October 2010) he was involved in the 2010 investigations at Lake Perućac, which he has described as "the largest mass grave in Europe", estimating that there are over 2000 bodies in the lake, predominantly those of victims of the 1992 Višegrad massacres.

During the Bosnian war Amor Mašović was the person responsible on the Bosnian government side for negotiating prisoner exchanges and was involved in the ultimately fruitless negotiations for the exchange of Col. Avdo Palić, the "disappeared" commander of the enclave of Žepa

References

External links
 Bosnian Federal Commission for Missing Persons 

Living people
1955 births
Bosnia and Herzegovina politicians